Midnight in Mississippi is a 2008 album by American alternative country group Blue Mountain.

Track listing
Groove Me
By Your Side
70's Song
She's a Wild One
Midnight in Mississippi	
Emily Smiles
Butterfly
Pretty Please
Gentle Soul
Rainy Day
Free State of Jones
Skinny Dipping

Blue Mountain (band) albums